Tustin is a Metrolink train station in Tustin, California, United States. The station is located in a shopping plaza at the intersection of Jamboree Road and Edinger Avenue. Between October 2010 and September 2011, the parking lot was closed to all cars to facilitate the construction of a five-level, 733-space parking structure. When combined with the 91 surface parking spaces, the station has 824 parking spaces, nearly tripling available parking on site.

OCTA Routes 70, 72, 90, 472 and 473 serve this station. The City of Irvine's iShuttle also services the station during peak commute hours. The nearest stations served by Amtrak are Irvine and Santa Ana.

Service

Trains

Buses

References

External links 

Metrolink
Metrolink stations in Orange County, California
Bus stations in Orange County, California
Airport railway stations in the United States
John Wayne Airport
Railway stations in the United States opened in 2002